Florence Kaye (January 19, 1919 - May 12, 2006) was a member of a song-writing trio that also included Harvey Zimmerman (better known as Bill Giant) and Bernie Baum. She was born in New York City. She performed a radio show in Georgia and entertained troops for United Service Organizations. The three built a significant list of credits, including many songs recorded by Elvis Presley. The majority of their tunes were used in Presley's musicals. Their work was also credited in the American version of Osamu Tezuka's anime "Kimba the White Lion" (1965). The only hit song by the trio was Elvis' "(You're the) Devil in Disguise", in 1963.

The following films included songs composed by Kaye et al.

 Double Trouble
 Easy Come, Easy Go
 Follow That Dream
 Frankie and Johnny
 Fun in Acapulco
 Girl Happy
 Girls! Girls! Girls!
 Harum Scarum
 Kissin' Cousins
 Live a Little, Love a Little
 Paradise, Hawaiian Style
 Poison Ivy League
 Roustabout
 Spinout
 Viva Las Vegas (The title track was written by Doc Pomus and Mort Shuman.)

External links

Songwriters from New York (state)
1919 births
2006 deaths
20th-century American composers